Roger Arntzen (born 3 June 1976) is a Norwegian jazz bassist, known from playing in bands like In The Country, Ballrogg, Chrome Hill and Håvard Stubø Trio. He has also previously played within the band Østenfor Sol.

Career 

Arntzen was born in Bodø, Norway. He picked up playing the accordion at five years of age, changing instrument to the tuba when he was at high school. Later he switched to electric guitar bass, before he eventually became an upright bass player. He attended musical studies at the University of Oslo (1998–99) and at the Norwegian Academy of Music in Oslo (1998–2006).

Arntzen has been involved in different bands such as Østenfor Sol, and is now part of bands like the piano trio In The Country accompanied by the pianist and keyboarder Morten Qvenild and the drummer Pål Hausken. In the Country has been active since 2003, releasein five (2014) well received albums, This Was The Pace Of My Heartbeat (2004), Losing Stones (2006), Collecting Bones (2006) and Whiteout (2009). They were awarded "Young Jazz Musicians Of The Year 2004" in Norway. Down Beat called their debut album "one of the finest and most arresting albums to come out of Europe" that year, while All About Jazz reviewer John Kelman has suggested Whiteout as a contender for the "best of" list for 2009.

Honors 
2004: «JazzIntro» Newcomer Awarded as part of In The Country at Moldejazz, awarded by Rikskonsertene and Norsk Jazzforum

Diskografi

With Østenfor Sol
2001: Troillspel (Major Studio)

With Damp
2003: Mostly Harmless (Songs) (AIM Records)
2005: Hoatzin (AIM Records)

With Subtonic
2004: In This House (AIM Records)

With In the Country
2005: This Was The Pace Of My Heartbeat (Rune Grammofon)
2006: Losing Stones, Collecting Bones (Rune Grammofon)
2009: Whiteout (Rune Grammofon)
2011: Sounds And Sights (Rune Grammofon), live album including a DVD
2013: Sunset Sunrise (ACT)

With Chrome Hill
2008: Earthlings (Bolage)

With Ballrogg
2008: Ballrogg (Bolage)
2010: Insomnia (Bolage)
2012: Cabin Music (Hubro)

With Erik Wesseltoft
2013: To Someone I Knew (Normann Records)

References

External links

 
 In the Country website
 Ballrogg website

1976 births
Living people
21st-century double-bassists
21st-century Norwegian bass guitarists
21st-century Norwegian male musicians
Jazz double-bassists
Male double-bassists
Male jazz composers
Norwegian jazz composers
Norwegian jazz upright-bassists
Norwegian jazz bass guitarists
Norwegian male bass guitarists
Norwegian Academy of Music alumni
University of Oslo alumni
Musicians from Bodø
Chrome Hill (band) members
In the Country members